Cypress High School is a public high school in the city of Cypress, California. It was founded in 1973 and serves grades 9 through 12. Cypress is one of eight high schools in the Anaheim Union High School District (AUHSD).

History
Cypress was first established in 1973, and was honored as a California Distinguished School in 2007.

Athletics
Cypress's sports teams compete in the Empire League and the CIF Southern Section. The school mascot is the centurion of Roman fame.  The school colors are navy blue, orange, and white. In 2007, baseball team was ranked in the Top 25 for all prep teams nationwide.

CIF Southern Section championships
 Boys Golf 2005
 Baseball: 2005, 2013, 2019 
 Football: 2007
 Softball: 1983, 1987, 1992, 2019 
Girls Volleyball: 2007
Boys Tennis 2016
Boys Volleyball: 2017

Performing arts
The Cypress High School Centurion Imperial Brigade performed in the 2015 Rose Parade in Pasadena, California on New Year's Day.
After the 2020 online season they changed their name to Sound In Motion.

Cypress currently has three competitive show choirs: the mixed-gender "High Voltage" and "Shockwaves" as well as the all-female "Thunderstorms". The program has fluctuated over the years from four show choirs to a singular 15-member group. The show choirs formerly hosted an annual competition entitled Star Reflections.

Notable alumni
Scott Aukerman, writer, actor, comedian, television personality, director, producer, and podcast host
Marko Cavka, former professional American football offensive tackle
Lanny Cordola, guitarist, songwriter, and producer
Joel Crawford, film director
Christopher Dorner, former LAPD officer accused of killing four people, including two police officers, in a week-long killing spree
Emily Dole, athlete, actress, and professional wrestler
Jamil Douglas, American football offensive guard currently for the New York Giants
Jarren Duran, current professional baseball outfielder for the Boston Red Sox
David Fletcher, Infielder for the Los Angeles Angels
Dominic Fletcher 75th pick in the 2019 Major League Baseball draft by the Arizona Diamondbacks. He is the brother of Angels Infielder David Fletcher.
Justin Lin, director & producer
Clarence Moore, American football wide receiver who played in the National Football League; he is currently a free agent
Scott Moore, professional baseball infielder for the Houston Astros of Major League Baseball
Troy O'Leary, professional baseball outfielder who played with the Milwaukee Brewers, Boston Red Sox, Montreal Expos and Chicago Cubs 
Brian Tochi, actor, best known for role in Revenge of the Nerds
Josh Vitters, third pick in the 2007 Major League Baseball Draft (Chicago Cubs)
Adrian Young, drummer for No Doubt

References

External links

Cypress High School Website
Anaheim Union High School District Website

High schools in Orange County, California
Cypress, California
Public high schools in California
1973 establishments in California
Educational institutions established in 1973